Abraham John Palmer (1847 – April 17, 1922) was an American physician, Methodist minister and politician from New York.

Life
Palmer was elected in November 1912 as a Progressive with Republican endorsement to the New York State Senate (27th D.), and was a member of the 136th and 137th New York State Legislatures in 1913 and 1914.

In April, 1913, he introduced a bill in the New York Legislature to repeal public utility franchises of all types after a term of twenty-five years.

In February 1914, he announced that he would not vote with the Progressives anymore, after a combination of Democratic and Progressive legislators had elected Homer D. Call as State Treasurer. He died on April 17, 1922.

References

Republican Party New York (state) state senators
New York (state) Progressives (1912)
20th-century American politicians
1847 births
1922 deaths